Patrick Savage (19 November 1882 – 9 November 1969) was a Scottish professional football goalkeeper who played in the Scottish League for Cowdenbeath, Dunfermline Athletic and St Bernard's. He also served as assistant trainer at King's Park.

Personal life 
Savage worked as a miner and his uncle James also played football as a full back for Cowdenbeath. In 1915, during the first 12 months of the First World War, he enlisted in the Fife and Forfar Yeomanry and his battalion would later become a member of the Black Watch. Savage saw action during the Mesopotamian campaign and on the Western Front. After the war, he returned to work as a miner and later as a barman.

References 

Scottish footballers
1969 deaths
Black Watch soldiers
British Army personnel of World War I
1882 births
Scottish Football League players
Cowdenbeath F.C. players
People from Cowdenbeath
Dunfermline Athletic F.C. players
Reading F.C. wartime guest players
St Bernard's F.C. players
Scottish miners
Bartenders
King's Park F.C. players
Association football goalkeepers